Nova in comics may refer to:

 Nova Corps, an intergalactic police force 
 Nova (Richard Rider), the first character known as Nova
 Nova (Sam Alexander), a member of the Nova Corps
 Nova (Frankie Raye), the former herald of Galactus

See also
 Nova (disambiguation)